Heartaches is a 1981 Canadian comedy film written by Terence Heffernan and directed by Donald Shebib. It stars Margot Kidder, Annie Potts, Winston Rekert and Robert Carradine. The movie is about two young women who form an unlikely friendship on a bus ride to Toronto.

The plot bears similarities to Shebib's best known film, Goin' Down the Road, in which two male partners-in-crime deal with poverty, factory jobs, pregnancy, and moving to a big city.

Plot 
Young housewife Bonnie (Annie Potts) is on a bus to Toronto. She is pregnant, which her husband Stanley (Robert Carradine), an auto mechanic and aspiring race car driver, is delighted about. However, Stanley is unaware he is not the real father of the baby and Bonnie is seeking an abortion. On the bus, Bonnie meets Rita (Margot Kidder), a free-spirited itinerant between jobs. The two women become friends and decide to get an apartment together in Toronto, eventually finding jobs at a mattress factory. Dealing with romance and poverty, they learn that they have more in common than they thought.

Rita sets her romantic sights on Marcello (Winston Rekert), the factory owner’s nephew. As Bonnie contemplates getting an abortion, Stanley tracks her down and she is forced to admit the truth. Rita’s affair with Marcello ends in betrayal when his fiancée from Italy arrives. Stanley and Bonnie eventually reunite after he comes to terms with Bonnie’s infidelity and agrees to help raise the baby as his own.

Cast

Production 
Donald Shebib had been planning to make Heartaches since 1976. According to Shebib, “the script was originally based upon a book called 'The Bottle Factory Outing' [by Beryl Bainbridge]...I changed it from a bottle factory to a mattress factory. Eventually the script was so different from the book that we paid [Bainbridge] the rights for the book back. When she did see the film, she loved it.”

The start of filming was delayed several weeks because of an unpaid bond that was required by ACTRA, the Canadian actors' trade union. Filming resumed when movie financing and management company Seven Arts Studios was able to raise the needed funds. Heartaches was shot mostly in Toronto, with one week in Atlanta, Georgia.

Reception 
The film was very well-received. The New York Times wrote, "Nothing happens in 'Heartaches' that isn't telegraphed 15 minutes ahead of time, but Miss Kidder and Miss Potts are good fun to watch, not because they convince you of the reality of their characters but because they handle their assignments with such unbridled, comic, actressy enthusiasm.”

Variety said, the "cast is outstanding with Kidder giving full performance. However, it is basically Potts’ film as the runaway wife who’s tired of her husband’s immature attitude.”

Accolades 
Heartaches was nominated for eleven Genie Awards, winning for Lead Actress for Margot Kidder, Foreign Actress for Annie Potts, and Original Screenplay for Terence Heffernan.

References

External links 

1981 films
1980s female buddy films
1980s buddy comedy films
Canadian romantic comedy films
1981 romantic comedy films
English-language Canadian films
Films directed by Donald Shebib
Films shot in Georgia (U.S. state)
Films shot in Toronto
Films set in Toronto
1980s road movies
Films about abortion
1980s English-language films
1980s Canadian films